Villa Huidobro (also known as Cañada Verde) is a city in the southwest of the province of Córdoba, Argentina. It lies about 380 km south of the provincial capital Córdoba, and 18 km north of the provincial border with La Pampa. Villa Huidobro is named after José Ruiz Huidobro, governor of San Luis Province, who commanded the central column of the 1833 Desert Campaign that defeated Ranquel chieftain Yanquetruz at the battle of Las Acollaradas Lakes near the city.

References
 Municipality of Villa Huidobro — Official website.
 

Populated places in Córdoba Province, Argentina
Populated places established in 1907